Federal Highway 80D is the designation for toll highways paralleling Mexican Federal Highway 80. There are two such roads, one between Zapotlanejo and Lagos de Moreno, Jalisco and the other connecting Lagos de Moreno to San Luis Potosí City.

Zapotlanejo-Lagos de Moreno
The  road is operated by Red de Carreteras de Occidente, which charges a toll of 70 pesos per car to travel its full length.

A connection east of the northern terminus on Highway 80 transfers motorists directly to Mexican Federal Highway 45D (León-Aguascalientes). This stretch opened in 2014.

Lagos de Moreno-San Luis Potosí
The  highway between Lagos de Moreno and San Luis Potosí was completed in 2012. Its concession is held by FONADIN, and the road is operated by Caminos y Puentes Federales which charges cars 95 pesos to use the road.

Libramiento Norte de San Patricio-Melaque
The  Road is complete but it is charging 10 pesos to Ride in its entirety It provides a better option to ride for people traveling from Autlan de Navarro to Manzanillo without having to cross the town of San patricio and Barra de Navidad it reduces traffic on Mexican Federal Highway 80 and Mexican Federal Highway 200 bettwen both towns.

References 

Mexican Federal Highways